Michael Alicto (born 28 August 1982) is a sprinter who represents Guam. He competed in the 100 metres event at the 2013 World Championships in Athletics.

Competition record

References

1982 births
Living people
Guamanian male sprinters
Place of birth missing (living people)
World Athletics Championships athletes for Guam